Swara is a concept in Indian classical music.

Swara may also refer to:

 Swara, Nepal, a town
 Swara (custom) or Vani, a forced marriage custom in parts of Pakistan
 Swara (Indonesia), a former Indonesian television channel
 Swara (film), an upcoming Sri Lankan Sinhala film
 Swara Magazine, an African wildlife conservation magazine